Ngã Năm is a district-level town (thị xã) of Sóc Trăng province in the Mekong River Delta region of Vietnam, was established on 29 December 2013. As of 2013 the district had a population of 84,022. The district-level town covers an area of 242.2435 km².

Administrative divisions

3 phường (urban wards): 1 (formerly Ngã Năm town), 2 (formerly Long Tân commune), 3 (formerly Vĩnh Biên commune) and 5 xã (suburban communes): Long Bình, Mỹ Bình, Mỹ Quới, Tân Long, Vĩnh Quới.

References

Districts of Sóc Trăng province
County-level towns in Vietnam